The 1978 Miami Dolphins season was the franchise's 9th season in the National Football League, the 13th overall, and the 9th under head coach Don Shula. The team returned to the NFL playoffs for the first time since 1974, with an 11–5 record. Quarterback Bob Griese missed the first seven games due to a knee injury. The Dolphins got off to a 5–2 start behind back-up Don Strock. Upon Griese's return, the Dolphins earned a birth to the playoffs as a Wild Card. Helping to lead the Dolphins back to the postseason was Running Back Delvin Williams who set a team record with 1,258 yards rushing on the season. In the first playoff game involving two Wild Cards, the Dolphins were stunned 17-9 by the Houston Oilers at the Orange Bowl. In the process the Dolphins set two notable records: scoring first in all but one of their sixteen regular season games, and never trailing at any point in eleven games. The former record was equalled by the 2004 Patriots, and the latter was beaten by the 2005 Colts.

Offseason

NFL Draft

Personnel

Staff

Roster

Standings

Regular season

Schedule

Results

Week 3

Playoffs

AFC Wildcard Playoff (Sunday December 24, 1978): vs. Houston Oilers

Awards and honors

Milestones

Notes and references

Miami Dolphins on Pro Football Reference
Miami Dolphins on jt-sw.com

Miami
Miami Dolphins seasons
Miami Dolphins